Enkhuizen is a terminus railway station in Enkhuizen, Netherlands. The station opened on 6 June 1885 and is located at the end of the Zaandam–Enkhuizen railway. The station and services are operated by Nederlandse Spoorwegen. The station has a nearby ferry departure point with a ferry to Stavoren. There is also a ferry to and from Medemblik, allowing one to travel the so-called "historical triangle" using the Steamtrain Hoorn Medemblik from Hoorn to Medemblik, the boat to Enkhuizen and the train back to Hoorn from here (or the other way around). Both ferry services operate only during the summer.

Train services
The following services currently call at Enkhuizen:
2x per hour intercity service Enkhuizen–Hoorn–Amsterdam–Hilversum–Amersfoort (–Deventer)
2x per hour intercity service Enkhuizen–Hoorn–Amsterdam (peak hours)

Bus service

References

External links

NS website 
Dutch Public Transport journey planner 
Connexxion Noord Holland website 

Railway stations in North Holland
Railway stations opened in 1885
Railway stations serving harbours and ports
Buildings and structures in Enkhuizen